Nile Gregory Rodgers Jr. (born September 19, 1952) is an American record producer, musician, and composer. The co-founder of Chic, he has written, produced, and performed on records that have sold more than 500 million albums and 75 million singles worldwide.  He is a Rock and Roll Hall of Fame and Songwriters Hall of Fame inductee, and the recipient of six Grammy Awards, including the Grammy Lifetime Achievement/Special Merit Award.  Known for his chucking guitar style, in 2014 Rolling Stone wrote that "the full scope of Nile Rodgers' career is still hard to fathom".

Formed as the Big Apple Band in 1972 with bassist Bernard Edwards, Chic released their self-titled debut album in 1977, including the hit singles "Dance, Dance, Dance (Yowsah, Yowsah, Yowsah)" and "Everybody Dance". The 1978 album C'est Chic produced the hits "I Want Your Love" and "Le Freak", with the latter selling more than seven million singles worldwide. The song "Good Times" from the 1979 album Risqué was a number one single on the pop and soul charts, and became one of the most-sampled songs of all time, "ushering in" hip-hop via the Sugarhill Gang's "Rapper's Delight", inspiring Queen's "Another One Bites the Dust", and anchoring the Daft Punk hit "Around the World".

With Edwards, Rodgers wrote and produced music for other artists, including the songs "He's the Greatest Dancer" and "We Are Family" for Sister Sledge and "I'm Coming Out" and "Upside Down" for Diana Ross. After Chic's breakup in 1983, Rodgers produced several major albums and singles for other artists, including David Bowie's Let's Dance, "Original Sin" by INXS, Duran Duran's "The Reflex" and "Notorious", and Madonna's "Like a Virgin". He later worked with artists including The B-52s, Jeff Beck, Mick Jagger, Grace Jones, The Vaughan Brothers, Bryan Ferry, Christina Aguilera, Lady Gaga, and Daft Punk, winning three Grammy Awards in 2014 for his work on their album Random Access Memories.

In 2018, Rodgers co-founded Hipgnosis Songs Fund, a publicly traded music intellectual property investment company.

Early life
Nile Gregory Rodgers Jr. was born on September 19, 1952 in the Lower East Side, New York City to Beverly Goodman. She gave birth to Rodgers when she was 14. His biological father, Nile Rodgers Sr. –  a traveling percussionist who specialized in Afro-Cuban beats –  was rarely present as Rodgers grew up; although influential in his life, Rodgers saw his father only a "handful" of times prior to his death in 1970. In 1959, Goodman married Bobby Glanzrock, whom Rodgers described in his 2011 autobiography as a "beatnik PhD, whose observations had angles that would make Miles Davis contemplate his cool." Richard Pryor, Thelonious Monk, and Lenny Bruce often visited their home in Greenwich Village. Glanzrock and Goodman were addicted to heroin, and Rodgers began using drugs at 13.

Before learning to play the guitar at 16, Rodgers played the flute and the clarinet. As a teenager, he played guitar with African, Persian, Latin, jazz and Boogaloo bands. He became a subsection leader of the Lower Manhattan branch of the New York Black Panther Party as a teenager. His cousin, trumpeter Robert "Spike" Mickens was a member of hitmakers Kool and the Gang from 1964 to 1986. Rodgers was raised Catholic.

Career

1970s: Formation of Chic, "Le Freak", Sister Sledge
Rodgers met bassist Bernard Edwards in 1970 while working as a touring musician for the Sesame Street stage show. Together they formed The Big Apple Band, and worked as back-up musicians for the vocal group New York City ("I'm Doin' Fine Now"). New York City's one hit allowed them to tour extensively, opening for The Jackson 5 on the American leg of their first world tour in 1973. The band dissolved after their second album failed to yield a hit, but Nile and Bernard joined forces with drummer Tony Thompson, and worked and recorded as a funk rock band called The Boys, which played numerous gigs up and down the East Coast. Although there was label interest, record companies passed on the band after discovering its members were black, believing that black rock artists would be too hard to promote.

As the Big Apple Band, Rodgers and Edwards worked with Ashford & Simpson, Luther Vandross, and many others. Since another New York artist, Walter Murphy, had a band called The Big Apple Band, Rodgers and Edwards were forced to change their band's name to avoid confusion. Thus, in 1977 the band was renamed as Chic.

Inspired by Roxy Music, Chic developed a sound that was a fusion of jazz, soul, and funk grooves with melodies and lyrics with a European influence. Between gigs, they recorded the song "Dance, Dance, Dance", with then-boss Luther Vandross on vocals. Originally released by Buddah Records, it was a hit when it was re-released by Atlantic in the summer of 1977. Atlantic picked up an album option with Rodgers and Edwards, who quickly wrote more songs, and Chic's self-titled debut was released in November.

The band scored numerous top ten hits and helped propel disco to new levels of popularity,  with "Le Freak", "I Want Your Love", "Everybody Dance", "Dance, Dance, Dance (Yowsah, Yowsah, Yowsah)", "My Forbidden Lover", and "Good Times" becoming club/pop/R&B standards. "Le Freak" was Atlantic Records' only triple platinum selling single at the time, and "Good Times" shot to No. 1 in August 1979 in spite of that year's "Disco Sucks" movement protesting that style of music.

The success of Chic's first singles led Atlantic to offer Rodgers and Edwards the opportunity to produce any act on its roster. They chose Sister Sledge, whose 1979 album, We Are Family, peaked at No. 3 and remained on the charts well into 1980. The first two singles, "He's the Greatest Dancer" and the title cut "We Are Family" both reached No. 1 on the R&B chart, and No. 6 and No. 2, respectively on the Pop chart. In April 2018, "We Are Family" was selected to be preserved in the Library of Congress.

1980s: Diana Ross, David Bowie, INXS, Madonna, Duran Duran
The 1979 disco backlash derailed Chic, and Edwards retreated from work, while Rodgers' drug use accelerated. Rodgers and Edwards delivered their final Atlantic album under contract, Believer, in 1982. They completed one of their last projects together in 1980, writing and producing the album Diana for Diana Ross, which yielded the hits "Upside Down" and "I'm Coming Out". They produced Deborah Harry's 1981 solo album Koo Koo, and produced the hit "Spacer" for the French disco act Sheila and B. Devotion.  During the same time period, Chic's song "Good Times" was sampled on The Sugarhill Gang's "Rapper's Delight", the first multiple-platinum hip hop single. The song continued to influence the sounds of others, including Queen, (with the 1980 hit "Another One Bites the Dust") and Blondie, who had a #1 hit with "Rapture". Following Chic's breakup, Rodgers released his first solo album, Adventures in the Land of the Good Groove.

With Chic no longer occupying most of his time, Rodgers was free to focus on working with other artists. He produced David Bowie's biggest selling album Let's Dance, which yielded the hit singles "Let's Dance", "China Girl", and "Modern Love". He produced the single "Original Sin" by INXS, and in 1984, he produced Madonna's album Like a Virgin, which scored three hit singles including its title track, "Material Girl", and  "Dress You Up".  He worked extensively with Duran Duran, remixing their biggest-selling single, "The Reflex", producing "Wild Boys" on their 1984 live album, Arena, and co-producing the album Notorious.

In 1985, Rodgers produced albums for Sheena Easton, Jeff Beck, Thompson Twins, Mick Jagger, and others, and performed at Live Aid with Madonna and the Thompson Twins. He was named the #1 Singles Producer in the World by Billboard at the end of the year. To complete the decade, he produced albums for Grace Jones, Al Jarreau (L is for Lover), Earth Wind and Fire's vocalist Philip Bailey, and performed on "Higher Love" with Steve Winwood, as well as on records for Cyndi Lauper, and others. In 1989, he co-produced the B-52's multi-platinum album Cosmic Thing; it reached No. 4 on the Billboard 200 album chart, and yielded the singles "Love Shack", and "Roam". He produced Workin' Overtime, Diana Ross' return to Motown, and the soundtracks for Alphabet City, Gremlins, White Nights, and The Fly.  He later composed an orchestral soundtrack, his first, for the film Coming to America.

Rodgers formed the short-lived experimental band Outloud in 1987, with David Letterman's guitarist, composer, and vocalist Felicia Collins and French session musician, producer, composer, and keyboardist Philippe Saisse; the trio released a single album, Out Loud, on Warner Bros. Records.

1990s: Production, reformed Chic and death of Edwards, Sumthing Else
 In September 1990, shortly after the death of Stevie Ray Vaughan, the Rodgers-produced Vaughan Brothers album, Family Style was released. He also produced projects for David Bowie, Eric Clapton, The B-52s, David Lee Roth, Ric Ocasek, The Stray Cats and others early in the decade,  and worked on the soundtracks for Thelma and Louise, Cool World, and The Beavis and Butt-head Experience.

Rodgers and Edwards reformed Chic in 1992 and recorded new material for the album Chic-Ism.
In 1996 they released a Japan-only album consisting of old Chic material rerecorded with guest vocalists, Chic Freak and More Treats. Edwards and Rodgers performed with Sister Sledge, Steve Winwood, and Slash in a series of commemorative concerts in Japan.   Edwards died following a concert on April 17, 1996. Rodgers discovered his body. He later said that when Edwards died he "cried like a baby and suffered intensely but eventually realised the best tribute to him would be to carry on and be the best I could be." A year later, Rodgers returned to Japan to pay homage to his fallen partner, and in 1999, Rodgers released Live at the Budokan, a live recording of Edwards' final performance. The album was not overdubbed or changed in order to keep the recording pure.

Rodgers started playing live concerts again while composing and producing music for film soundtracks: Beverly Hills Cop III, Blue Chips, The Flintstones and Feeling Minnesota, working with Bob Dylan, among others.

In 1997, Notorious BIG released "Mo Money Mo Problems" sampling Rodgers and Edwards' song "I'm Coming Out" from Diana Ross's platinum album, Diana.  "Mo Money, Mo Problems" topped the Billboard Hot 100 for two weeks  and was nominated for the 1998 Grammy Award for Best Rap Performance by a Duo or Group.

In 1998, Rodgers founded Sumthing Else Music Works record label and Sumthing Distribution, an independent music label distributor. Sumthing focused on distributing video game soundtracks, and released the world's first 5.1 surround DVD game-soundtrack album. Its titles include the Halo, Resident Evil, Gears of War and Borderlands series.

2000s: Film and video game soundtracks, We Are Family Foundation 
In the early 2000s, Rodgers worked extensively on film and video game soundtracks, including Halo 2, Rush Hour 2, Snow Dogs, and Semi-Pro starring Will Ferrell, who co-wrote the title song "Love Me Sexy" with Rodgers.

In 2002, Rodgers returned to work again with the original five members of Duran Duran when he co-produced Astronaut. The album rose to No. 3 in the UK.

Following the September 11 attacks, to start the healing process, Rodgers brought together more than 200 musicians and celebrities to record "We Are Family". It was recorded in New York at Avatar Studios (previously The Power Station, where the original recording of "We Are Family" took place in 1978), and in Los Angeles at the Record Plant. The accompanying music video was directed by Spike Lee.  An 80-minute documentary, The Making and Meaning of We Are Family, directed by Danny Schechter, premiered at the Sundance Film Festival in 2002.  In a collaboration between Disney, Nickelodeon and PBS, more than 100 children's television characters participated in a "We Are Family" children's music video, and on March 11, 2002, Disney Channel, Nickelodeon and PBS aired the video to promote tolerance and diversity on the 6-month anniversary of 9/11. In July 2002, Rodgers co-founded the We Are Family Foundation with his
life partner, Nancy Hunt. A non-profit organization that promotes "cultural diversity while nurturing and mentoring the vision, talents, and ideas of young people who are positively changing the world," it is dedicated to the vision of a global family.

2010s: Autobiography, Daft Punk, Songwriters Hall of Fame, It's About Time

In 2010, Rhino Records released a four-CD box set, Nile Rodgers Presents The Chic Organization, Volume 1: Savoir Faire, which for the first time collected tracks from all of the acts produced by The Chic Organization up to their original break-up in 1983. Rodgers provided sleevenotes for the set, which was also reissued in 2013. Rodgers' critically acclaimed autobiography, Le Freak: An Upside Down Story of Family, Disco, and Destiny was published by Spiegel & Grau, a Random House imprint, in late 2011. It was named one of the top 10 of the 25 Greatest Rock Memoirs of All Time by Rolling Stone.

In February 2012, Rodgers announced that he was collaborating with electronic band Daft Punk for their latest album, "teasing out their R&B influences".  The record, Random Access Memories was released in 2013. Rodgers co-wrote and played guitar on three tracks: "Give Life Back to Music", "Lose Yourself to Dance", and "Get Lucky". In April, "Get Lucky" entered the UK Singles Chart at No. 3, only 24 hours after its release, and two weeks later rose to No. 1.  In an interview with Official Charts Company, Rodgers said, "I've had big records and Number 1s; I have had records that were Number 1 in the United States but nowhere else ... I've had records which have done well [in the UK], but not in the States. But to have this ubiquitous record, that is a hit everywhere ... It's amazing to me! I'm out on the road and I can hear it wherever I go. I'm flabbergasted!"  "Get Lucky" became one of the UK's biggest-selling singles of all time.

Rhino Records released Nile Rodgers Presents The Chic Organization Up All Night (The Greatest Hits), a compilation album featuring songs written, played or produced by Rodgers and Bernard Edwards for Chic and various artists, including Diana Ross, Sister Sledge, Carly Simon, Debbie Harry, Johnny Mathis, Sheila & B. Devotion and Norma Jean Wright. Up All Night reached No. 2 on the UK Compilation Album Chart for the week ending July 13, 2013.  In October 2013, Rhino released Nile Rodgers Presents The Chic Organization Up All Night (The Greatest Hits Disco Edition), which included a medley taken from Chic ft. Nile Rodgers' live performance at the 2013 Glastonbury Festival.

Rodgers and Bernard Edwards were nominated to the Songwriters Hall of Fame in October 2013.  In January 2014, Rodgers performed "Get Lucky" with Daft Punk on the Grammy Awards, along with Pharrell Williams and Stevie Wonder, with a medley including elements of Chic's "Le Freak" and Wonder's "Another Star". Rodgers won three Grammy Awards for his work with Daft Punk and Random Access Memories, including Best Pop Duo/Group Performance, Record of the Year and Album of the Year.  In March, Rolling Stone named Nile Rodgers one of the 50 Most Important People in EDM, stating, "The full scope of Nile Rodgers' career is still hard to fathom, and it's not just ongoing, it's in overdrive."  In December,  NARAS announced that "Le Freak" would be inducted into The Grammy Hall of Fame.

Rodgers' solo single "Do What You Wanna Do (IMS Anthem)" was released on August 10, 2014 to benefit the We Are Family Foundation.  A year later, in March 2015, Rodgers released Chic's first single in more than 23 years, "I'll Be There", with a live streamed concert from The Roundhouse in London.  The song, created by Rodgers from original Chic outtake tapes from the 70s, with Bernard Edwards, Tony Thompson, and vocalists Alfa Anderson and Luci Martin. The song went to #1 on Billboard's Dance Music Chart, June 20, 2015.  In August, Rodgers launched FOLD Festival (FreakOut! Let's Dance), A multi-day event with a diverse line-up of artists including Beck, Duran Duran, Chaka Khan, Keith Urban, Janelle Monáe, Ginger Minj, Chic and many others.

Rodgers collaborated with Lady Gaga to remake Chic's hit, "I Want Your Love" for Tom Ford's Spring/Summer 2016 collection video in lieu of a fashion show.

Rodgers and Bernard Edwards were inducted into the Songwriters Hall of Fame on June 9, 2016.  In 2017, after 11 nominations for Chic, Rodgers was inducted into the Rock and Roll Hall of Fame with an award for Musical Excellence. "It's sort of bittersweet," says Rodgers. "I'm quite flattered that they believed that I was worthy, but my band Chic didn't win. They plucked me out of the band and said, 'You're better than Chic.' That's wacky to me ... I am flattered and I think it's cool, but I feel like somebody put me in the lifeboat and told my family they can't get in."

On the evening of June 2017 Rodgers and Chic returned to the Glastonbury Festival, as headliners on the Pyramid Stage, for an audience of close to 100,000. In September of the same year, a version of George Michael's song "Fantasy" was released, credited to "George Michael featuring Nile Rodgers." The track, released as a B-side by Michael's label in 1990, was reworked by Rodgers and featured him prominently on guitar. It was Michael's only posthumous release.

In June 2018, "Till the World Falls", the first single from Nile Rodgers & Chic's first album since 1992, It's About Time, was released. The song featured Mura Masa, Cosha and Vic Mensa.  The album was released in September 2018, and hit the Top 10 in the UK. It was the first Chic record to hit the Top 10 in 25 years.  Two singles from the album were subsequently released: "Sober" featuring Craig David and Stefflon Don, and  "Do You Wanna Party" featuring LunchMoney Lewis. In December 2018, Nile Rodgers & Chic began their first UK arena tour.  They were nominated for a Brit Award in the "Best International Group Category", in January 2019.

In November 2018, to mark the 40th anniversary of "Le Freak", Rhino/Atlantic released The Chic Organisation 1977-79, a 6-CD box set containing Chic's first three albums, Sister Sledge's We Are Family and a collection of rarities, including a facsimile of Chic's first single – a 12″ promo for "Dance, Dance, Dance (Yowsah, Yosah, Yosah)" released by Buddah Records in 1977.

In January 2019, Rodgers offered 600 free tickets to furloughed US Federal workers during the US Government Shutdown to the Nile Rodgers & Chic concert at the MGM National Harbor in Washington, DC.
Nile Rodgers played Cardiff Castle Wales on July 12, 2019, and on February 17, 2020, he participated in Eric Clapton's tribute concert for Ginger Baker.

2020s: Keith Urban, Hipgnosis, Beyoncé and Grammys
On November 13, 2020, Rodgers was featured on "Stop Crying Your Heart Out" as part of the BBC Radio 2's Allstars' Children in Need charity single. The single debuted at number 7 on the Official UK Singles Chart and number 1 on both the Official UK Singles Sales Chart and the Official UK Singles Download Chart.

Among other artists,  in 2021, Rodgers worked with Jack Savoretti and Keith Urban.   "Who's Hurting Who ft. Nile Rodgers", the first single from Savoretti's Europiana album was released in May. In April 2021 he teamed with Urban and Breland on the music video for "The Cage", a track from Urban's 2020 album The Speed of Now Part 1. 

In the summer of 2021, Rodgers, with Constellation Immersive, launched DiscOasis, an ongoing 1970s-themed disco and roller skating pop-up party at the South Coast Botanic Garden in Rancho Palos Verdes.  Developed in part to provide an outside experience during the COVID-19 pandemic, DJs select music from crates of records that Rodgers hand picked from his personal collection.

On 4 June 2022, Rodgers performed with Duran Duran at the Platinum Party at the Palace.   He co-wrote the track "Cuff It", which appeared on the Beyoncé album, Renaissance released in July 2022.  It debuted at #1 on the Apple Music charts.

In July 2022, Hipgnosis Songs Fund was valued at US $2.69 billion.

Rodgers performed Modern Love and Let's Dance with Josh Homme, Omar Hakim and Gaz Coombes at the Taylor Hawkins Tribute Concert at Wembley Stadium on September 3, 2022.

In February 2023, Rodgers won two Grammy Awards, Best Electronic/Dance Album and Best R&B Song ("Cuff It"), for his work with Beyonce on Renaissance. He also received the Lifetime Achievement/Special Merit Grammy Award in 2023.

Television and film
Since his 1978 debut with Chic on American Bandstand, Rodgers has performed on more than 150 television programs. He has been the subject of documentaries including the BBC's Nile Rodgers: The Hitmaker, Front and Center: Songwriters Hall of Fame: Nile Rodgers on PBS, Arte France's Nile Rodgers: Secrets of a Hitmaker, and the short film Composing America: The Musical Talents of Nile Rodgers. The BBC also broadcast Nile Rodgers: How To Make It in the Music Business, a three-hour, three part special. In 2018, Once in a Lifetime Sessions with Nile Rodgers premiered on Netflix.

Rodgers has appeared in documentaries about David Bowie, Diana Ross, Elton John, Michael Jackson, Rick James, George Michael, Duran Duran, Daft Punk, Public Enemy, Madonna, Avicii, Studio 54, the Seventies, the Eighties, the Nineties, recorded music, girl groups, the disco era, disco, house music, funk, and soul music.

The Hitmaker
Rodgers plays a 1960 Fender Stratocaster with a 1959 neck, nicknamed The Hitmaker, which he acquired as a trade-in at a shop in Miami Beach, Florida. Exceptionally light, it has a maple fingerboard and a worn white finish. Rodgers claims it has a unique sound. After Rodgers purchased the guitar, Edwards taught him how to play it in a chop chord style, which he called "chucking". In his autobiography, Rodgers wrote: "He fingered the chords with his left hand, and his right hand would continuously play sixteen notes to the bar while accenting the main parts of the rhythm ... One lesson was all I needed. For the next few nights straight, while my roommate pursued all manner of trysts, I was having a love affair in the bathroom with my new ax. In just a few days, I'd emerge as a chucking funk guitarist who knew more jazz chord inversions than most of my R&B counterparts."

The Fender Custom Shop introduced a limited edition Nile Rodgers Hitmaker Stratocaster, a recreation of Rodgers' guitar, in January 2014.

Hipgnosis Songs Fund

In 2018, Rodgers founded the music IP investment and song management company Hipgnosis Songs Fund along with Merck Mercuriadis.

Personal life
In the early 1990s, Rodgers woke up in the hospital to learn that his heart had stopped eight times, and he was alive only due to the actions of the doctor who was filling out his death certificate. He stopped using drugs and alcohol in 1994 after a friend showed him a tape of a poor performance. In the mid-1990s, Rodgers was in a relationship with Kenyan singer Lamya.

Rodgers was diagnosed with an aggressive form of prostate cancer in October 2010. He documented his illness on a blog called Walking on Planet C.  He was given the all-clear in 2013. In 2017, a growth on his right kidney was diagnosed as two different cancers within one mass. The mass was surgically removed in November 2017. He said he expected a 100% recovery. At his performance at the Hollywood Bowl, on July 4, 2019, Rodgers announced that he was "100% cancer-free."

Rodgers lived in Westport, Connecticut until July 2021 when he moved to Miami, Florida, with his life partner, Nancy Hunt. Rodgers also owns an apartment in New York City.

Works

Selected discography

Chic
 Chic (1977)
 C'est Chic (1978)
 Risqué (1979)
 Real People (1980)
 Take It Off (1981)
 Soup for One (soundtrack, Chic/various artists) (1982)
 Tongue in Chic (1982)
 Believer (1983)
 Chic-ism (1992)
 It's About Time (2018)
 The Chic Organization, 1977–1979 (2018)

Solo
 Adventures in the Land of the Good Groove (1983)
 B-Movie Matinee (1985)
 Chic Freak and More Treats (1996)

Outloud
 Outloud (1987)

Soundtracks
 Soup for One (1982)
 Alphabet City (1984)
 Coming to America (1988)
 Earth Girls Are Easy (1988)
 White Hot (1989)
 Beverly Hills Cop III (1994)
 Blue Chips (1994)
 Curdled (1996)
 Public Enemy (1999)
 Rise of Nations (2003) Game
 Halo 2 Soundtrack (2004) Game
 Conker: Live & Reloaded (2005) Game
 Perfect Dark Zero (2005) Game
 Halo 3 Soundtrack (2007) Game

Live
 Live at the Budokan (1999)
 Up All Night (Chic, various artists) (2013)

Selected production discography 

 Norma Jean, Norma Jean Wright (1978)
 We Are Family, Sister Sledge (1979)
 King of the World, Sheila B. Devotion (1980)
 Love Somebody Today, Sister Sledge (1980)
 diana, Diana Ross (1980)
 I Love My Lady, Johnny Mathis (1981, released in 2017)
 KooKoo, Debbie Harry (1981)
 Let's Dance, David Bowie (1983)
 Talkback, Spoons (1983)
 "Original Sin", INXS (1984)
 Like a Virgin, Madonna (1984)
 "The Reflex", "The Wild Boys", Duran Duran (1984)
 "Out Out'", Peter Gabriel (1984)
 Flash, Jeff Beck (1985)
 She's the Boss, Mick Jagger (1985)
 Here's to Future Days, Thompson Twins, (1985)
 Do You, Sheena Easton (1985)
 When The Boys Meet The Girls, Sister Sledge (1985)
 Home of the Brave, Laurie Anderson (1986)
 Notorious, Duran Duran (1986)
 Inside Story, Grace Jones (1986)
 Cosmic Thing, The B-52's (1989)
 Workin' Overtime, Diana Ross (1989)
 Family Style, Vaughan Brothers (1990)
 "Real Cool World", David Bowie (1992)
 Good Stuff, The B-52's (1992)
 Black Tie White Noise, David Bowie (1993)
 Your Filthy Little Mouth, David Lee Roth (1994)
 "We Are Family", Nile Rodgers All Stars (We Are Family Foundation) (2001)
 Only a Woman Like You, Michael Bolton	(2002)
 Astronaut, Duran Duran (2004) 
 Hotel Room Service (Songwriter for Pitbull) (2009)
 "Shady", Adam Lambert ft. Sam Sparro and Nile Rodgers (2012)
 "Get Lucky" ft. Pharrell Williams and Nile Rodgers, Random Access Memories, Daft Punk (2013)
 "Give Life Back to Music", Random Access Memories, Daft Punk (2013)
 "Lose Yourself to Dance" Random Access Memories, Daft Punk (2013)
 "Lay Me Down", Avicii featuring Adam Lambert and Nile Rodgers True, (2013)
 "The Other Boys", NERVO ft. Kylie Minogue, Jake Shears and Nile Rodgers, Collateral (2015)
 "Pressure Off", Duran Duran ft. Janelle Monáe and Nile Rodgers, Paper Gods (2015)
 "Sun Don't Let Me Down", Keith Urban ft. Nile Rodgers & Pitbull (2016) 
 "Telepathy", Christina Aguilera ft. Nile Rodgers (2016)
 "Fantasy", George Michael ft. Nile Rodgers (2017)
 "Le Canzoni alla Radio", Max Pezzali ft. Nile Rodgers (2017)
 "Till the World Falls", Nile Rodgers, Chic, Mura Masa ft. Cosha & Vic Mensa (2018)
 "Sober", Nile Rodgers, Chic, ft. Craig David & Stefflon Don (2018)
 "Do You Wanna Party", Nile Rodgers, Chic, ft. LunchMoney Lewis (2018)
 "Emotional", Michelle Treacy (2019)
 "Summer Lover", Oliver Heldens ft. Devin & Nile Rodgers (2019)
 "Roses", Adam Lambert ft. Nile Rodgers (2020)
 "Cielo", Manuel Medrano ft. Nile Rodgers (2020)
 "One More", Times, SG Lewis (2020)

 "Agua", Daddy Yankee ft. Rauw Alejandro & Nile Rodgers (2022)

Autobiography

Collaborations 

 Diana — Diana Ross (1980)
 KooKoo — Debbie Harry (1981)
 Let's Dance — David Bowie (1983)
 Hearts and Bones — Paul Simon (1983)
 Like a Virgin — Madonna (1984)
 Do You — Sheena Easton (1985)
 Boys and Girls — Bryan Ferry (1985)
 She's the Boss — Mick Jagger (1985)
 L Is for Lover — Al Jarreau (1986)
 True Colors — Cyndi Lauper (1986)
 So — Peter Gabriel (1986)
 Inside Story — Grace Jones (1986)
 Inside Out — Philip Bailey (1986)
 Workin' Overtime — Diana Ross (1989)
 Move to This — Cathy Dennis (1990)
 Mariah Carey — Mariah Carey (1990)
 Other Voices — Paul Young (1990)
 Fireball Zone — Ric Ocasek (1991)
 Hat Full of Stars — Cyndi Lauper (1993)
 Black Tie White Noise — David Bowie (1993)
 Mamouna — Bryan Ferry (1994)
 HIStory: Past, Present and Future, Book I — Michael Jackson (1995)
 Mind Body & Soul — Joss Stone (2004)
 Olympia — Bryan Ferry (2010)
 Les chansons de l'innocence retrouvée — Etienne Daho (2013)
 Lay Me Down — Avicii and Adam Lambert (2014)
 Avonmore — Bryan Ferry (2014)
 Velvet — Adam Lambert (2020) ("Roses")
 Out The Cage — Keith Urban and Breland (2020)
 No Words Needed — Rebecca Ferguson (2021)
 Who's Hurting Who — Jack Savoretti (2021)
 Legendaddy — Daddy Yankee (2022)
 Passion feat. Nile Rogers — Roosevelt (2022)
 Pre-Code Hollywood — Jonathan Bree (2022)

Recognition

References

External links

 
 
 We Are Family Foundation

1952 births
Living people
Rhythm guitarists
African-American guitarists
African-American record producers
American dance musicians
African-American songwriters
American funk guitarists
American rock guitarists
American soul guitarists
American male guitarists
American rhythm and blues guitarists
Grammy Award winners
Record producers from Connecticut
People from Westport, Connecticut
Remixers
Chic (band) members
Lead guitarists
Mirage Records artists
Record producers from New York (state)
African-American rock musicians
Songwriters from New York (state)
Guitarists from New York City
20th-century American guitarists
The Honeydrippers members
20th-century American male musicians
20th-century African-American musicians
21st-century African-American people
American male songwriters
African-American Catholics